In the 1913 season of the Campeonato Paulista, two championships were disputed, each by a different league.

APSA Championship 

Before the start of the 1913 championship, a split happened within the LPF - Paulistano left the league, uncomfortable with the growing inclusion of lower-class teams, like Ypiranga and the recently-joined Corinthians, in the league, in addition to the fact that the league moved its official playing field to the Parque da Antarctica Paulista (which was used by Germânia), in detriment of their own stadium, the Velódromo Paulistano, and was joined by AA das Palmeiras and Mackenzie. The new league would be called the APSA (Associação Paulista de Sports Athleticos). Paulistano won the title for the 3rd time. the top scorer position was shared by three players with 3 goals.

System
The championship was disputed in a triple-round robin system, with the team with the most points winning the title.

Championship

LPF Championship

The edition of the 1913 Campeonato Paulista organized by the LPF (Liga Paulista de Football) ended with Americano winning the title for the 2nd time. the top scorer was Americano's Décio Viccari with 7 goals.

System
The championship was disputed in a double-round robin system, with the team with the most points winning the title.

Championship

References

Campeonato Paulista seasons
Paulista